Valley Flyer was the trading name of Cityline New Zealand Ltd, a subsidiary of NZ Bus, an Infratil company, until July 2018. It was part of the Stagecoach Group of companies, trading as Cityline Hutt Valley, and also operated services out of Papakura in Auckland before amalgamation with Stagecoach Auckland. Prior to this, the greater part of the operation was part of New Zealand Railways Road Services.

In 2018, when new Metlink Wellington bus contracts came into operation, NZ Bus lost the majority of its public transport contracts in the Hutt Valley (with the exception of the Eastbourne services). As part of this change, all buses in the region were branded as "Metlink" and so the Valley Flyer brand has ceased to exist. The company continues to operate the Airport Flyer service.

Operations

Valley Flyer's operations centered around its Waterloo depot, adjacent to Waterloo Interchange, with satellite depots at Eastbourne, Wainuiomata, Stokes Valley and Upper Hutt. Valley Flyer operated scheduled bus services and some school-bus runs in the Hutt Valley under contract to Greater Wellington Regional Council as part of the Regional Council's Metlink network.

References

Bus companies of New Zealand
Bus transport in New Zealand
Public transport in the Wellington Region
Lower Hutt
Upper Hutt